Vali Mohammad Bazar (also Romanized as Valī Moḩammad Bāzār) is a village in Polan Rural District, Polan District, Chabahar County, Sistan and Baluchestan Province, Iran. At the 2006 census, its population was 588, in 141 families.

References 

Populated places in Chabahar County